The 1946 NCAA Track and Field Championships were contested at the 25th annual NCAA-hosted track meet to determine the team and individual national champions of men's collegiate track and field events in the United States. This year's meet was hosted by the University of Minnesota at Memorial Stadium in Minneapolis, Minnesota.

Illinois captured the team championship, their second title in a three years and fourth overall.

Team Result
Note: Top 10 finishers only
 (H) = Hosts

See also
 NCAA Men's Outdoor Track and Field Championship
 1945 NCAA Men's Cross Country Championships

References

NCAA Men's Outdoor Track and Field Championship
1946 in sports in Minnesota
NCAA